The East Hendred Brook is a small tributary of the River Thames which starts on the springline at the base of the Berkshire Downs, and joins the Thames between Abingdon and Wallingford.

Rivers of Oxfordshire